Kate Lynne Bock (born 30 January 1988) is a Canadian model known for her appearances in the Sports Illustrated Swimsuit Issue since 2013. In 2020, she appeared on the cover, alongside Olivia Culpo and Jasmine Sanders.

Early life 
Bock was born on 30 January 1988 in Vancouver. She studied at a French immersion school in Canada and speaks fluent French. Growing up in Canada, she was into sports, including swimming, soccer, baseball and field hockey.

Career 
Bock was discovered aged 12 at a local swimming pool in Vancouver. She subsequently signed a modeling contract and traveled to Santa Barbara to shoot for Abercrombie Kids. At age 18, she moved to Paris. 

Bock appeared in numerous magazines such as Germany's Vogue, Hungary's Glamour and Italy's Elle. She has been featured in magazine covers of the US' Ocean Drive and Fitness, Australia's Grazia, UK's Glow, Canada's Elle and Maxim.

She has been featured in advertisements by a number of major brands including Victoria's Secret, Guess, Brooks Brothers, L'Oréal, Kérastase, Banana Republic and Ralph Lauren. In 2011, Bock appeared as a character parodying Elvira Hancock in the music video for the song "Jack Sparrow" by comedy troupe The Lonely Island.

In December 2021, Bock launched a swimwear capsule collection with Australian brand Bond-Eye, which included five styles. She has also designed a jewelry line called Cattura.

In 2021, she started working as a chief brand officer for hard sparkling water brand Pompette and a creative consultant for the shopping application Verishop.

Personal life 
Bock had been dating professional basketball player Kevin Love for "nearly five years" in 2020, before her engagement with him on 31 January 2021. They got married in late June 2022 at the New York Public Library inspired by The Great Gatsby. Bock is Jewish.

References

External links
 Official website
 Kate Bock on Twitter
 Kate Bock at Sports Illustrated Swimsuit

1988 births
21st-century Canadian businesspeople
Canadian Jews
Businesspeople from Vancouver
Canadian drink industry businesspeople
Canadian expatriates in France
Canadian expatriates in the United States
Female models from British Columbia
Jewish female models
Living people
The Society Management models
Basketball players' wives and girlfriends